Hohe Börde was a Verwaltungsgemeinschaft ("collective municipality") in the Börde district, in Saxony-Anhalt, Germany. It was situated west of Magdeburg. The seat of the Verwaltungsgemeinschaft was in Irxleben. It was disbanded on 1 January 2010.

The Verwaltungsgemeinschaft Hohe Börde consisted of the following municipalities (population in 2006 between brackets):

Former Verwaltungsgemeinschaften in Saxony-Anhalt